The Hochschule für Technik Stuttgart - University of Applied Sciences (HFT Stuttgart) is one of ten institutes for higher education in Stuttgart.  It was founded in 1832 as a school for construction craftsmen (Winterschule für Bauhandwerker) and was inaugurated as a University of Applied Sciences in 1971.

The campus is located in downtown Stuttgart.

Faculties and programmes 
There are three faculties offering the following programmes:

Faculty of Architecture and Design:
Architecture (Bachelor and Master)
Interior Design (Bachelor)
Climate engineering (Bachelor)
International Project Management (Master)
International Master of Interior-Architectural Design (Master)
Urban Planning (Master)
Faculty of Civil Engineering, Building Physics and Business Management
Building Physics (Bachelor)
Building Physics and Business Management (Bachelor)
Business Management (Bachelor)
Business Psychology (Bachelor)
Civil Engineering (Bachelor)
Civil Engineering / Tunnel Building (Master)
Environmental Protection (Master)
General Management (Master)
Infrastructure Management (Bachelor)
Structural Engineering (Master)
Sustainable Energy Competence (Master)
Faculty of Geomatics, Computer Science and Mathematics
Computer Science (Bachelor)
Information Logistics (Bachelor)
Business Information Systems (Bachelor)
Mathematics (Bachelor and Master)
Surveying and Geoinformatics (Bachelor)
Surveying (Master)
Software Technology (Master)
Photogrammetry and Geoinformatics (Master)

Involvement 
As part of the FH-Impuls project i_city, which is funded by the Federal Ministry of Education and Research (Germany), an explorative project on smart public buildings has been started in October 2017. As the project is based on openHAB, the HFT Stuttgart became a member of the openHAB foundation and also regularly hosts meetings and conferences about openHAB and related smart home topics.

References

External links 
 Stuttgart Technology University of Applied Sciences

Universities and colleges in Baden-Württemberg
Technical universities and colleges in Germany
Educational institutions established in 1832
Education in Stuttgart
1832 establishments in Germany
19th-century establishments in Württemberg
Universities of Applied Sciences in Germany